Anasigerpes unifasciata is a species of praying mantis in the family Hymenopodidae. It is found in West Africa (Ivory Coast, Ghana, and Guinea).

See also
List of mantis genera and species

References

U
Mantodea of Africa
Insects of West Africa
Insects described in 1979